Walter Krawec (born 9 June 1951) is a Canadian rower. He competed in the men's coxed pair event at the 1976 Summer Olympics.

References

1951 births
Living people
Canadian male rowers
Olympic rowers of Canada
Rowers at the 1976 Summer Olympics
Place of birth missing (living people)